Symphony No. 63 may refer to:

Joseph Haydn's Symphony No. 63 in C major
Alan Hovhaness's Symphony No. 63, Op. 411, Loon Lake

063